John Helder Wedge (1793 – 22 November 1872) was a surveyor, explorer and politician in Van Diemen's Land (now Tasmania, Australia).

Wedge was the second son of Charles Wedge of Shudy Camps, of Cambridgeshire, England. John Wedge learned the basics of surveying from his father. Due to financial losses during the post-war depression in agriculture, Wedge and his brother Edward decided to migrate to Van Diemen's Land; before leaving London Wedge had obtained an appointment in the colony as assistant surveyor.

Van Diemens Land
The brothers arrived in Van Diemen's Land aboard the Heroine on the morning of 15 April 1824.
Wedge led several expeditions through heavily timbered and mountainous country in the north-east and central highlands of the island. On one of these journeys Wedge found a camp of the bushrangers led by Matthew Brady. For Wedge's efforts in their capture he was rewarded with a land grant in 1826; later he applied for another grant for the capture of five absconders. Wedge was sent to the far north-west in 1828 to examine the lands of the Van Diemen's Land Company. Wedge reported much rich soil in the heavily timbered area but the Company wanted pasture land immediately available and disputed the accuracy of Wedge's map. Part of Wedge's work included investigating grants surveyed earlier by George Evans and Thomas Scott who were both accused of receiving bribes for measuring more than the authorized area to settlers. Wedge proved that the accusations were well founded.

A large expedition was organized by the surveyor-general, George Frankland, in February 1835 to explore the country lying between the Derwent, Gordon and Huon Rivers. Wedge, as leader of one of the parties, proved a resourceful and intelligent bushman, covering much difficult territory. Wedge won Frankland's praise for his efforts in the Survey Department whose staff was overworked. Wedge was keen for promotion and came to believe that his hopes were being frustrated by nepotism at the Colonial Office. In his survey work Wedge had often visited John Batman at Kingston, and together they planned an expedition across Bass Strait.

Port Phillip District
 When Batman returned from his first visit in 1835 Wedge resigned from the Survey Department and crossed to Port Phillip, arriving on 7 August 1835 where he explored along the Barwon River and surveyed the  'acquired' by Batman's Port Phillip Association from the Indigenous Australians. Wedge arrived the site of Melbourne on 2 September 1835, where he discovered members of a party organized by John Pascoe Fawkner. Wedge was against the forceful removal of Fawkner's party by its rivals, and played an important part in the founding of the settlement of Melbourne. Wedge named the Yarra River on 13 September 1835.

 
Wedge was one of the first to bring over sheep from Tasmania, to his station at Werribee. Wedge also reported to Lieutenant-Governor Arthur on the wild white man, William Buckley, whose pardon he recommended, and on outrages against the Aboriginals, for whose hopeless condition he had much compassion. He had earlier  adopted an Aboriginal boy, May Day, rescued from the surf near Circular Head, Tasmania. His 'Narrative of an excursion amongst the natives of Port Phillip' and a 'Description of the country around Port Phillip' were among the expedition papers published as a Tasmanian parliamentary paper (1885). The Journal of the Royal Geographical Society (1836) printed Wedge's paper 'On the country around Port Phillip, South Australia'. The diaries of his explorations and survey work were sent to his father in England; the Royal Society of Tasmania published them in 1962.

From 1838 to 1843 Wedge visited England; on the death of his father he returned to Tasmania to find his finances  reduced by economic depression. In 1843 Wedge married Maria Medland Wills, who had been governess to Bishop Francis Russell Nixon's children, but within a year she died in childbirth. Wedge was then appointed by Nixon from 1846–51 to manage the farms which formed the endowment of Christ's College at Bishopsbourne. In 1855 Wedge was elected to the district of Morven in Tasmanian Legislative Council. Wedge held office in the short-lived ministry of Thomas Gregson in 1857, as member for North Esk, and initiated the inquiry into the convict department under its comptroller, Stephen Hampton. Wedge was an active Anglican; one of his last acts before withdrawing from parliament in 1868 was to support the commutation bill that granted £100,000 to religious denominations in place of annual state aid. Wedge died on 22 November 1872 at his home Medlands which he had built on the Forth River in 1865.

Leighland

In or soon after 1824, Wedge was granted a 1500-acre property which he called Leighland, later known as Leighlands, situated on the South Esk River, south of the town of Perth, in the Norfolk Plains district of Tasmania. He subsequently developed the property into a large sheep farm, building a house which was completed between 1830 and 1833.

Leighland passed on the death of John Helder Wedge to his nephew Thomas Wedge, and on his death in 1880 eventually went out of the Wedge family, and, following its acquisition by Alfred Youl, has since been in the Youl family. The old homestead was burnt down in the 1950s.

References

J. Uhl, 'The Men from East Anglia: the Wedge Family an early pioneering family in Van Diemen's Land and Port Phillip', reprinted from the Victorian Historical Magazine Vol XXXVII No 1 (Melbourne 1966);
Crawford et al. (editors) The Diaries of John Helder Wedge, Royal Society of Tasmania, (Hobart 1962); Correspondence File for Wedge in Tasmanian Archives)

John Helder Wedge, Field book 1835-1836. [manuscript].  MS 10768. State Library Victoria (Australia)

External links
Images and transcript of John Helder Wedge's field book
Map of Port Phillip at the State Library of Victoria
Drawing of Leighland, from c. 1843

1793 births
1872 deaths
Explorers of Australia
History of Tasmania
History of Victoria (Australia)
Members of the Tasmanian Legislative Council
Van Diemen's Land people
Colony of Tasmania people
19th-century Australian politicians
19th-century Australian public servants
People from Cambridgeshire
English emigrants to colonial Australia